Letter to President is a 2018 Burmese drama film, directed by Wyne starring A Linn Yaung, Phway Phway, Chan Min Ye Htut and May Sue Maung. The film, produced by Sein Htay Film Production premiered Myanmar on October 19, 2018.

Cast
A Linn Yaung as Aung Kyaw
Phway Phway as Khat Khat Khaing
Chan Min Ye Htut as John
May Sue Maung

References

External links

2018 films
2010s Burmese-language films
Burmese drama films
Films shot in Myanmar
Films directed by Wyne
2018 drama films